Kaoru is a Japanese given name for males or females.

Name Meanings
The name's
meaning varies depending on its written form:
薫/郁/芳 — "fragrance", common for both males and females
馨/香 — "fragrance", more common for females
かおる —　purely phonetic form in hiragana; no inherent meaning
かをる — same as above, using を as an archaic substitute for お
カオル — phonetic form in katakana

As a distinctly unisex name, its usage in popular culture has risen in recent years to give the named character an air of androgyny.  Such characters commonly have overt androgynous qualities as well.

A similar name, in terms of both pronunciation and meaning, is Kaori.  It is used exclusively for females.

People
Kaoru 薫 (m) (one of the guitarists of Dir En Grey)
Kaoru Abe 阿部薫 (m) (free Jazz saxophonist)
, Japanese film director, producer and editor
Kaoru Fujino かほる (voice actor)
, Japanese speed skater
Kaoru Hasuike 薫 (m) (academic, writer, translator, and Japanese national once abducted by North Korea)
Kaoru Ide, Japanese architect
Kaoru Ikeya 薫 (m) (astronomer)
Kaoru Inoue 馨 (m) (statesman)
Kaoru Ishibashi (m) (musician, Kishi Bashi)
Kaoru Ishikawa (m) (business theorist, developer of the Ishikawa diagram)
, Japanese musician
Kaoru Kobayashi (m) (actor)
Kaoru Maeda 薫 (f) (professional wrestler)
, Japanese sport shooter
Kaoru Mitoma (m), Japanese footballer
Kaoru Mori 薫 (f) (manga author)
, Japanese lawyer and judge
, Japanese voice actress
Kaoru Sugayama かおる (f) (volleyball player)
, Japanese novelist and essayist
, Japanese footballer
Kaoru Uno 薫 (m) (mixed martial artist)
Kaoru Usui 薫 (m) (photographer)
 Kaoru Kimura (f) Japanese astronomy educator; President, International Planetarium Society 2021-22
Kaoru Wada 薫 (m) (composer)
, Japanese basketball player
Kaoru Yosano 馨 (m) (politician)

Fictional characters
Kaoru (f) - Rilakkuma and Kaoru
Kaoru Toki 時 カオル (f) - Seitokai Yakuindomo
Kaoru (m) - Uninhabited Planet Survive!
Kaoru Akashi (f) - Zettai Karen Children
Kaoru (f) - Daughter of Smoke and Bone
Kaoru Amane 薫 (f) - Taiyou no Uta
Kaoru Asahina (m) - Junjo Romantica
Fujiwara no Kaoru a.k.a. Murasaki Shikibu (m) - Akane-sasu Sekai de Kimi to Utau
Kaoru Genji 薫 (m) - Tale of Genji
Kaoru Hanabishi (m) - Ai Yori Aoshi
Kaoru Hitachiin 馨 (m) - Ouran High School Host Club
Kaoru Hondobou (m) - Gyakuten Saiban 3
Kaoru Kaidoh 薫 (m) - Prince of Tennis
Kaoru Kameyama (m) - Aibō
Kaoru Kamiya 薫 (f) - Rurouni Kenshin
Kaoru Kiryuu 薫 (f) - Futari wa Pretty Cure Splash Star
Kaoru Kiryūin (m) - Moero! Nekketsu Rhythm Damashii Osu! Tatakae! Ouendan 2
Kaoru Kishimoto 薫 (m) - Hikaru no Go
Kaoru Koganei 薰 (m) - Flame of Recca
Kaoru Kondo (f) - Saido Kā ni Inu
Kaoru Kurusu (m) - Uta no Prince-Sama
Kaoru Maki カオル (f)  - Puella Magi Kazumi Magica
Kaoru Matoba 薫 (m) - Area no Kishi
Kaoru Matsubara 松原かおる (f) - Demashita! Powerpuff Girls Z
Kaoru Matsutake 香 (m) - Mirmo!
Kaoru Mitarai (f) - Pita Ten
Kaworu Nagisa 渚カヲル (m) - Neon Genesis Evangelion
Kaoru Ōba (Wendy Oldbag) (f) - Phoenix Wright: Ace Attorney
Kaoru Orihara (also known as "Kaoru-no-kimi") (f) - Oniisama e...
Kaoru Saionji (m) - Gakuen Heaven
Kaoru Sakurazuka (m) - Yin-Yang! X-Change Alternative
Kaoru Sasakura (f) -Marumo no Okite
Kaoru Seo (m) - Sekirei
Kaoru Shiba (f) - Samurai Sentai Shinkenger
Kaoru Sugimura (m) - Nana to Kaoru
Kaoru Watabe (f) - King of Fighters 97
Kaoru Yamazaki 山崎 薫 (m) - Welcome to the NHK
Kaoru Mido (f) - Tsukuyomi: Moon Phase
Kaoru Ichihara 壱原かおる (f) - Mahou No Princess Club! De Javu!
Kaoru Kirishima (m) - Our Two Bedroom Love Story
Kaoru Nagumo (m) - Hakuouki
Kaoru Seta 瀬田薫 (f) - BanG Dream!
Kaoru Sakurayashiki (m) - SK8 the Infinity
All names (except for Fujiwara no Kaoru and Kamiya Kaoru) are in western naming order.

References

See also
Kaworu
Japanese names

Japanese unisex given names